Curzio Cocci (died 1621) was a Roman Catholic prelate who served as Archbishop of Conza (1614–1621).

Biography
On 3 March 1614, Curzio Cocci was appointed during the papacy of Pope Paul V as Archbishop of Conza.
On 9 March 1614, he was consecrated bishop by Giovanni Garzia Mellini, Cardinal-Priest of Santi Quattro Coronati with Ulpiano Volpi, Archbishop of Chieti, and Tommaso Confetti, Bishop of Muro Lucano, serving as co-consecrators. 
He served as Archbishop of Conza until his death in November 1621.

References 

17th-century Roman Catholic archbishops in the Kingdom of Naples
Bishops appointed by Pope Paul V
1621 deaths
Archbishops of Sant'Angelo dei Lombardi-Conza-Nusco-Bisaccia